The Finding of Moses is a 1701 oil on canvas painting by Charles de La Fosse. It was commissioned for the billiards room at the Palace of Versailles and is now in room 36 of the Sully Wing of the Louvre Museum.

References

1700s paintings
La Fosse
Paintings in the Louvre by French artists